Yelena Korban (née Didilenko; born April 20, 1961) is a retired track and field sprinter from the Soviet Union, known for winning the bronze medal in the women's 4x400 metres relay at the 1982 European Championships. She did so alongside Irina Olkhovnikova, Olga Mineyeva and Irina Baskakova, clocking a total time of 3:22.79.

A year later Korban repeated that feat at the inaugural World Championships, this time with Marina Ivanova-Kharlamova, Irina Baskakova, and Mariya Kulchunova-Pinigina.

References

1961 births
Living people
Russian female sprinters
Soviet female sprinters
Place of birth missing (living people)
World Athletics Championships medalists
European Athletics Championships medalists
World Athletics Championships athletes for the Soviet Union
Universiade medalists in athletics (track and field)
Universiade gold medalists for the Soviet Union
Medalists at the 1983 Summer Universiade